Arthur Cyril Cattley (27 November 1861 – 21 September 1895) was an English cricketer. He played one first-class match for Surrey in 1882.

See also
 List of Surrey County Cricket Club players

References

External links
 

1861 births
1895 deaths
Cricketers from Croydon
English cricketers
Surrey cricketers